Christine Anne Luchok Fallon (born November 17, 1952) is an American lawyer. She served as the 16th Reporter of Decisions of the United States Supreme Court. Fallon began her service in 2011 and retired in September 2020. She is the first woman to hold the position.

Education
Fallon earned her bachelor's degree from West Virginia University in 1974, graduating magna cum laude. She earned her J.D. from the Columbus School of Law at the Catholic University of America in 1977.

Career

Early law career
Fallon practiced law in Pittsburgh, Pennsylvania, and Tallahassee, Florida. From 1982 to 1989, Fallon served as a legal editor at the Research Institute of America in Washington, D.C., where she supervised seven attorneys.

Deputy Reporter of Decisions
Fallon served as the Supreme Court's Deputy Reporter of Decisions from February 1989 until March 2011. She wrote syllabi and edited the opinions of the Court for release and publication in the United States Reports.

Reporter of Decisions
In March 2011, Fallon was promoted to the Supreme Court's Reporter of Decisions. She is the first woman to hold the position since its establishment in 1790. Over the course of her career, she has worked on many cases, including Bush v. Gore and the Patient Protection and Affordable Care Act case.

On July 7, 2020, the Supreme Court announced that Fallon would be retiring as the Reporter of Court Decisions, effective September 25, 2020, after 11 years as Reporter of Decisions and 31 total years working at the Court. Her successor was announced as Rebecca Anne Womeldorf.

Organizational memberships
Fallon has been active in the Association of Reporters of Judicial Decisions, having served as president, vice president, and secretary.

External links
 SCOTUS Notebook: The Mechanics and the Art of Court Decisions
Martindale-Hubbell Law Profile

References

1952 births
Living people
Reporters of Decisions of the Supreme Court of the United States
21st-century American lawyers
20th-century American lawyers
West Virginia University alumni
Columbus School of Law alumni